Swill is an album by the American punk rock band Ten Foot Pole. The band's first album, it was originally released under their former name, Scared Straight until later copies of the album changed it to Ten Foot Pole. The band released the album on their own label. Joey Cape from Lagwagon makes a special guest appearance on the last track, which is a cover of “Joy To The World”. The tracks “Life” and School” are re-recorded and expanded versions of songs that appeared on previous Scared Straight and compilation releases on Mystic Records.

Critical reception
AllMusic wrote that the album "is flatly produced and lacks immediately memorable material, but is refreshingly devoid of mainstream pretensions, especially for a band of their time and place (southern California, 1993)."

Track listing
"People Like You" - 2:06
"Skywalker" - 2:17  
"Pete's Shoes" - 2:32   
"Life" - 3:25  
"Home" - 2:43  
"Ultimatum" - 3:04  
"Forward" - 1:39  
"Third World Girl" - 3:36  
"Pete's Underwear" - 1:32  
"School" - 1:55  
"Man In The Corner" - 2:26
"Racer X" - 2:43
"Joy To The World" (Hoyt Axton cover) - 3:05

Credits
Dennis Jagard - guitar, producer
Scott Radinsky - vocals, producer
Pete Newbury - bass, producer
Steve Von Treetrunk - guitar, producer
Jordan Burns - drums, producer

Additional credit
Joey Cape - vocals for "Joy To The World" (Hoyt Axton cover)

References

1993 debut albums
Ten Foot Pole albums